Einar Kristgeirsson (born January 3, 1994 in Keflavik, Iceland) is an alpine skier from Iceland. He competed for Iceland at the 2014 Winter Olympics in the slalom and giant slalom.

See also
Iceland at the 2014 Winter Olympics

References

1994 births
Living people
Einar Kristgeirsson
Einar Kristgeirsson
Alpine skiers at the 2014 Winter Olympics
Einar Kristgeirsson
21st-century Icelandic people